Peter Bertram Coombs (born 30 November 1928) is an Anglican priest: he was the Archdeacon of Wandsworth from 1975  to 1988; and of Reigate from 1988 to 1995.
 
Coombs was educated at Reading School and Bristol University. He was a Curate at Christ Church, Beckenham, then Rector of St Nicholas, Nottingham from 1964 to 1968 and after that Vicar of Christ Church, New Malden from 1968 to 1975.

References

1928 births
People educated at Reading School
Alumni of the University of Bristol
Archdeacons of Wandsworth
Archdeacons of Reigate
Living people